Villains is the third studio album by Stray from the Path. The album was released on May 13, 2008, on Sumerian Records and Victory Records.

Track listing
 "Callous" - 1:41
 "Villain" - 2:33
 "To Vanish" - 2:13
 "The White Flag" - 1:42
 "Superstructure" - 1:40
 "Soviet" - 1:45
 "Lessons in Freud" - 1:41
 "The Art of Reprisal" - 1:42
 "The Spectre and His Mantra" - 1:04
 "Capital" - 2:08
 "Ataxia" - 2:08

Personnel
 Andrew "Drew York" Dijorio - lead vocals
 Tom Williams - lead guitar
 John Kane - guitar
 Frank Correira - bass guitar
 Justin Manas - drums

Production
 Kurt Ballou - producer, mixing, engineer

References

2008 albums
Stray from the Path albums
Sumerian Records albums
Victory Records albums
Albums produced by Kurt Ballou